Ada Susan Flatman (1876–1952) was a British suffragette who worked in the United Kingdom and the United States.

Life
Ada Susan Flatman was born in Suffolk in 1876. She was of independent means and became interested in women's rights. She lived in the same Twentieth Century Club Notting Hill rooms as fellow activist Jessie Stephenson.

Flatman was sent to Holloway Prison, after she took part in the raid on the Houses of Parliament in 1908, led by Marion Wallace Dunlop, Ada Wright, and Katherine Douglas Smith, and a second wave by Una Dugdale. The following year she was employed by the Women's Social and Political Union (WSPU) to organise their activities in Liverpool taking over from Mary Phillips. Flatman arranged humble lodgings for Constance Lytton when she came to Liverpool disguised as a working woman, aiming to get arrested for suffragette activism to created suitable publicity.

In May 1909, Flatman was in Bristol, and evaded detectives assigned to follow her – and many uniformed police officers – to distribute handbills about the suffragette cause. This took place in the Royal Hotel on the occasion of a speech to the Chamber of Commerce by the anti-suffrage politician Augustine Birrell.  In December of the same year, she was one of those in the Royal Albert Hall to protest against David Lloyd George's position regarding women's suffrage. In a contemporary newspaper account in the London Evening Standard, suffrage campaigner Frances Ede described how stewards dragged Flatman from her seat and removed her "with quite needless violence".

In July 1910, Flatman was a key speaker at one of the platforms in the 10,000 women's rally at Hyde Park. She worked with Alice Stewart Ker, but it was Flatman who was trusted by Emmeline Pethick when Liverpool requested that they be allowed to open a WSPU shop. The shop was set up for her by Patricia Woodlock and became a success and it raised substantial funds for the cause. Flatman organised the publicity surrounding the release of Woodlock who had completed a prison term in Holloway. A 1909 copy of Votes for Women depicted "Patricia" as a dreadnought. When she suddenly stepped down as branch co-ordinator  in 1910, over a difference in approach to campaigning, Alice Morrissey took over as volunteer branch organiser from Flatman, until another staff member was appointed to lead them.

In the following year, Flatman became the honorary secretary for the WSPU in Cheltenham. Emmeline Pankhurst visited Cheltenham shortly after her appointment and she had also started organising local "at homes". When the Liberal Government Minister Charles Hobhouse spoke in Gloucester's Shire Hall, Flatmen vainly tried to ask him questions about women's suffrage; she was ejected.

When the First World War started in 1914, the leading suffrage organisations agreed to suspend their protest until the war was over. Many activists disagreed; Flatman, living in Bristol, was one, joining the Women's Emergency Corps, founded by Evelina Haverfield. She decided to carry on her work in the United States, emigrating to work for Alice Paul's newspaper The Suffragist in 1915, becoming its business and advertising manager.

Flatman was in Chicago in 1916, working as an outdoor organiser for the Women's Party Convention taking place there. The New York Herald stated that she inaugurated the campaign of erecting billboards singlehandedly; noting that she did so dressed wholly in the suffrage colour of purple. The report further noted that Flatman was directing anti-Wilson billboard squads throughout the suffrage states with a view to them pasting a total of one million.

After the war, Flatman was keen to continue her suffrage work, but organisations in America and South Africa did not accept her offers of assistance. Full women's suffrage was achieved in the U.S. in 1920 and in the UK in 1928. Flatman returned to England in the 1930s, and was a peace campaigner, and supported the work of Edith How-Martyn in documenting the movement in the Suffragette Fellowship. Flatman left £25 in her will (out of an estate of £250) to the fellowship.

Flatman died in Eastbourne, Sussex, in 1952.

Legacy 

Flatman's reminiscences were recorded by the BBC. She had also kept a scrapbook of her suffrage adventures, now held by the Museum of London.

References

1876 births
1952 deaths
Politicians from Suffolk
English suffragists